The Berlin Requiem is an album by Autopsia, a Czech industrial/experimental music group.

Overview

When Mary Shelley makes a choice regarding the place on which Doctor Frankenstein will finally render to our memory the creature which he procreated, she opts for an icy wasteland. The place that looks like a perfect description of eternity, where everything is motionless, out of the senses, like a frozen image in which only a wind might be giving a promise of itself – a breath of death, something which remains at the very end, yet testifying that we are still here, on this side of the life.

It is as if The Berlin Requiem deals with what can scarcely be discerned by the senses, be heard, in the realm of the gelid nothingness. As if there faintly audible sounds of the alterations of crystals and frozen bodies are recorded. Duration of the sound is expanding to the very limits of articulation. Only the silent quiver of white light and cold motions is audible. The sound extends through the space that has neither the horizon, nor forms, nor boundaries. Perhaps it is the place where the change is the largest – one that cannot be uttered, such a large one that it cannot be recorded or comprehended.

And yet it is as if The Requiem belongs to a certain place and a certain time. This belonging is indicated through Berthold Brecht's poem and through Berlin itself – it is designated by the name of the world in which the death really occurs. The poem itself praises the transience – the moment when we actually separate ourselves from the things that do not mean anything to us, the moment when we can depart placidly. However, we almost cannot tell anything about this “placidity”, maybe only that it is almost light, cold – almost non-sensorial. What links the city and the frosty desert here is the unutterable itself. In order to perceive this, one needs not travel afar to the end of the world nor to climb high to mountain peaks.

Frankenstein's creature vanished in the white wasteland. We shall never learn if it crossed the frontier of death or is it still with us. It is as if The Requiem restores this ambiguity over and again, as if the sound is that which is still there – that which joins together the word and the unutterable.

Vladimir Mattioni
19. 02. 2007

Track listing
"Funeral Music I" – 7:32 
"Retorten Genese" – 9:41 
"Funeral Music II" – 6:51 
"Radical Machine 3.0" – 2:52 
"Funeral Music III" – 4:08 
"Sounds for Remembering Death" – 10:07

Personnel

All tracks composed by Autopsia.

 Musical
Performed by Dämmerung Orchestra

 

 Technical 

 Mustakillah Studio, Prague – engineering, mastering
 Cover design IkkONA

External links
  Autopsia on Last.Fm
 Autopsia''

Autopsia albums
2006 albums